A slowly pulsating B-type star (SPB), formerly known as a 53 Persei variable, is a type of pulsating variable star. They may also be termed a long-period pulsating B star (LPB). As the name implies, they are main-sequence stars of spectral type B2 to B9 (3 to 9 times as massive as the Sun) that pulsate with periods between approximately half a day and five days, however within this most member stars have been found to have multiple periods of oscillations. They display variability both in their light emission and in their spectral line profile. The variations in magnitude are generally smaller than 0.1 magnitudes, making it quite hard to observe variability with the naked eye in most cases. The variability increases with decreasing wavelength, thus they are more obviously variable in ultraviolet spectrum than visible light. Their pulsations are non-radial, that is, they vary in shape rather than volume; different parts of the star are expanding and contracting simultaneously.

These stars were first identified as a group and named by astronomers Christoffel Waelkens and Fredy Rufener in 1985 while looking for and analysing variability in hot blue stars. Improvements in photometry had made finding smaller changes in magnitude easier, and they had found that a high percentage of hot stars were intrinsically variable. They referred to them as 53 Persei stars after the prototype 53 Persei. Ten had been discovered by 1993, though Waelkens was unsure if the prototype was actually a member and recommended referring to the group as slowly pulsating B (SPB) stars. The General Catalogue of Variable Stars uses the acronym LPB for "comparatively long-period pulsating B stars (periods exceeding one day)", although this terminology is rarely seen elsewhere.

The similar Beta Cephei variables have shorter periods and have p-mode pulsations, while the SPB stars show g-mode pulsations.  By 2007, 51 SPB stars had been confirmed with another 65 stars possible members. Six stars, namely Iota Herculis, 53 Piscium, Nu Eridani, Gamma Pegasi, HD 13745 (V354 Persei) and 53 Arietis had been found to exhibit both Beta Cephei and SPB variability.

List
The following list contains selected slowly pulsating B-type stars that are of interest to amateur or professional astronomy. Unless otherwise noted, the given magnitudes are in the V-band.

Notes

References